Heringita amseli is a moth in the family Autostichidae. It was described by László Anthony Gozmány in 1954. It is found in Bahrain, Saudi Arabia, Afghanistan and Iran.

References

Moths described in 1954
Holcopogoninae